John Erskine (born June 26, 1980) is a Canadian former professional ice hockey defenceman. He played in the National Hockey League (NHL) with the Dallas Stars, New York Islanders and Washington Capitals.

Early life
Erskine was born in Kingston, Ontario, but grew up playing minor hockey in his hometown of Ajax, Ontario for the Ajax Knights of the Ontario Minor Hockey Association's (OMHA) York-Simcoe League and the Ajax-Pickering Raiders AAA of the OMHA's Eastern AAA League.

Career 
After a solid 1995–96 season with the Ajax-Pickering Raiders Midget AAA team, Erskine signed for the following season with the Quinte Hawks Jr.A. team of the Ontario Hockey Association's Metro Junior League.

The London Knights selected Erskine with the 2nd overall pick in the 1997 OHL Priority Selection.

Erskine was drafted 39th overall in the 1998 NHL Entry Draft by the Dallas Stars. For the 1997–98, 1998–99, and 1999–2000 seasons, Erskine played for the London Knights of the Ontario Hockey League. Erskine won the Max Kaminsky Trophy as top defenceman in the OHL in 1999–2000. He showed marked improvement from season to season until his promotion to the Utah Grizzlies of the International Hockey League in 2000.

Erskine's NHL debut came during the 2001–02 NHL season with Dallas, where he played 33 games, notching a single assist. He remained in Dallas until midway through the 2005–06 NHL season when Dallas traded Erskine to the New York Islanders for Finnish defenceman Janne Niinimaa. At the conclusion of the season, the Islanders did not re-sign Erskine, leaving him a free agent.

On September 14, 2006, Erskine signed as a free agent with the Washington Capitals. Following the end of the season he extended his stay with the Capitals for a further two years. In the final year of his contract a neck injury kept him out of the lineup for the entire 2014–15 season, effectively ending his playing career.

Career statistics

Awards and honours

References

External links

1980 births
Living people
Canadian ice hockey defencemen
Dallas Stars draft picks
Dallas Stars players
Houston Aeros (1994–2013) players
Hershey Bears players
Ice hockey people from Ontario
Iowa Stars players
London Knights players
New York Islanders players
People from Ajax, Ontario
Sportspeople from Kingston, Ontario
Utah Grizzlies (IHL) players
Utah Grizzlies (AHL) players
Washington Capitals players
Canadian expatriate ice hockey players in the United States